The 2019 Dublin Senior Hurling Championship was the 132nd staging of the Dublin Senior Hurling Championship since its establishment by the Dublin County Board in 1887. The championship began in April 2019.

Ballyboden St. Enda's were the defending champions, defeating Kilmacud Crokes in the 2018 final.

Group stage

Group 1

Final

References

Dublin Senior Hurling Championship
Dublin Senior Hurling Championship